Lixus fasciculatus is a species of weevils belonging to the family Curculionidae.

Distribution
This species can be found France, Germany, Hungary, Italy, Moldova, Poland, Slovakia, South European Russia, and in the eastern Palearctic realm.

Habitat
It prefers the regions with a mild winter. It inhabits sunlit forest edges, xerothermic grasslands, roadsides and clearings.

Description

These weevils  are rather long  with parallel sides and  a distinctive long snout, longer in females than in males. The antennae are geniculate with small clubs. The integument is black to dark brown, shiny, slightly veiled by a pubescence formed of small pale ocher yellow to golden yellow hairs. They form irregular cloudy spots on the elytra, and four longitudinal stripes on the prothorax. The body is more densely hairy towards the sides. The head is conical, with a superficial punctuation. Legs are quite thin and long.

Biology
Lixus fasciculatus is a univoltine species. Adults can be found from May to September. They  feed on Artemisia vulgaris, Artemisia absinthium and Tanacetum vulgare. Mating occurs on  the  host plants. Egg are laid into stems of Artemisia vulgaris, where preimaginal  development  occurs.

References

External links
 Barry Fotopage
 Insectamo.ru
 INPN

Lixinae
Beetles of Europe
Beetles described in 1836